

Jerry Lee Overton (born January 24, 1941 ) is a former American football safety in the National Football League for the Dallas Cowboys. He played college football at the University of Utah.

Early years
Overton attended Mar Vista High School, where he practiced football and track. He accepted a football scholarship from the University of Utah. 

As a sophomore, he registered 10 receptions (second on the team) for 193 yards (third on the team), a 19.3-yard average (second on the team), 2 receiving touchdowns (tied for the team lead) and 30 carries for 119 yards.

As a junior, he tallied 7 receptions (third on the team) for 80 yards (third on the team), one receiving touchdown, 27 carries for 158 yards (5.9-yard average) and 2 rushing touchdowns. He ranked 18th in the nation in kickoff returns, with a 30-yard average.

As a senior, he was limited with injuries, posting 18 receptions for 190 yards, one receiving touchdown and 36 carries for 182 yards (5.1-yard average).

Professional career
Overton was selected by the Dallas Cowboys in the 15th round (202nd overall) of the 1963 NFL Draft. As a rookie, he was tried at flanker, before being moved to safety. In 1964, he was placed on the injured reserve list with a broken leg he suffered in a skiing accident . He couldn't recover his previous form and was released on August 13, 1965.

References

1941 births
Living people
American football wide receivers
Dallas Cowboys players
People from Imperial Beach, California
Players of American football from California
Sportspeople from San Diego County, California
Utah Utes football players